Marina is a 1960 West German musical film directed by Paul Martin and starring Giorgia Moll, Rocco Granata and Bubi Scholz.

It was shot at the Spandau Studios in Berlin with sets designed by the art directors Paul Markwitz and Heinrich Weidemann.

Cast
 Rocco Granata as Rocco
 Giorgia Moll as Mary Miller
 Bubi Scholz as Ralf Moebius
 Teddy Stauffer as Robert Miller
 Rudolf Platte as Mr. Herzlieb, nightwatch
 Trude Herr as Trude Pippes
 Renate Holm as Mrs. Renate Henkel
 Jan & Kjeld as Singer
  as Silvio
 Rex Gildo as Rex
 Gerold Wanke as Max
 Jonny Buchardt as Fratzke
  as Gabriele, Mr. Herzlieb's niece
 Zizi Rascas as Zizi
 Irene Mann as Irene
 Hannelore Elsner as Christa
 Kurt Waitzmann as 1. Inspektor
 Kurt Pratsch-Kaufmann as 2. Inspektor
 Bully Buhlan as Peter Hiller

References

Bibliography
 Bjørn Rasmussen. Filmens hvem-vad-hvor: Udenlanske film 1950–1967. Politiken, 1968.

External links 
 

1960 films
1960 musical comedy films
German musical comedy films
West German films
1960s German-language films
Films directed by Paul Martin
Gloria Film films
Films shot at Spandau Studios
1960s German films